Sainte-Françoise is a municipality in the Centre-du-Québec region of the province of Quebec in Canada.

References 

Municipalities in Quebec
Incorporated places in Centre-du-Québec